Michael Godson Ifeanyichukwu, better known as Mike Godson (born October 10, 1985) is a Nigerian actor and businessman. He was born in Kano State, Nigeria but hails from Imo State.

Early life and education
Godson studied at the University of Jos, Plateau State and holds a bachelor's degree in theater and film arts.

Career
Mike Godson began acting in 2009 and has since become known for interpreting love roles in Nollywood. Godson has appeared in over 100 films. He has featured alongside actors such as Pete Edochie, Clem Ohameze, Kenneth Okonkwo, Van Vicker and John Dumelo. He got to the attention in 2015 after he did the movie titled 7 Books of Moses. In 2018 Godson signed a deal with a Bollywood production team linked to Zee World. Godson also runs an agro processing and commodity trading company. Although his acting career does provide him his basic needs, Godson has suggested that it might not be able to grant him financial security. He was appointed youth ambassador by the Independent National Electoral Commission in 2015.

Controversy
In April 2020 Godson was criticized for ridiculing poor Nigerians during the COVID-19 pandemic lockdowns.

Filmography
Secret Of Riches
Sincerely Mine
Kingdom of Darknesss
7 Book Of Moses
Wave of Madness
The Prince and the Slave
Sword of Vengeance
My Mother's Wish  
Ultimate Sacrifice
Unending Love
Amaka Ntu
Caught in the Act
The Real Deal
Amarachi

Awards and nominations

References

1985 births
Living people
Nigerian male film actors
21st-century Nigerian male actors
University of Jos alumni
Igbo actors
Nigerian businesspeople
Actors from Imo State
People from Imo State